Charles Raymond Bentley (December 23, 1929 – August 19, 2017) was an American glaciologist and geophysicist, born in Rochester, New York. He was a professor emeritus at the University of Wisconsin–Madison.  Mount Bentley and the Bentley Subglacial Trench in Antarctica are named after him. In 1957, he and a handful of other scientists including Mario Giovinetto set out on an expedition across West Antarctica in tracked vehicles to make the first measurements of the ice sheet.

He was awarded the Seligman Crystal by the International Glaciological Society in 1990. He died on August 19, 2017 at the age of 87 in Oakland, California.

References

External links 

 Oral History interview transcript for Charles R. Bentley on 6 August 2008, American Institute of Physics, Niels Bohr Library and Archives - Session I
 Oral History interview transcript for Charles R. Bentley on 7 August 2008, American Institute of Physics, Niels Bohr Library and Archives - Session II

1929 births
2017 deaths
American geophysicists
American glaciologists
American Antarctic scientists
Marie Byrd Land explorers and scientists
Phillips Academy alumni
University of Wisconsin–Madison faculty
People from Rochester, New York